2812 km is a rural locality (a railway station) in Glukhovskoye Rural Settlement of Kalachinsky District, Russia. The population was 21 as of 2010.

Geography 
The village is located 19 km east-north-east from Kalachinsk.

Streets 
 Zheleznodorozhnaya

References 

Rural localities in Omsk Oblast